The Long Night (also known as The Coven) is a 2022 American horror film written by Robert Sheppe and Mark Young and directed Rich Ragsdale. It stars Scout Taylor-Compton, Nolan Gerard Funk, Jeff Fahey, Deborah Kara Unger. The film is about a couple whose quiet weekend takes a bizarre turn when a nightmarish cult and their maniacal leader come to fulfill an apocalyptic prophesy.

Plot
While searching for the parents she's never known, New York transplant Grace returns to her childhood southern stomping grounds with her boyfriend Jack, to investigate a promising lead on her family's whereabouts. Upon arrival, the couple's weekend takes a bizarre, terrifying turn as a nightmarish cult and their maniacal leader terrorize the pair en-route to fulfilling a twisted ancient apocalyptic prophecy.

Cast
 Scout Taylor-Compton as Grace
 Nolan Gerard Funk as Jack
 Jeff Fahey as Wayne
 Deborah Kara Unger as The Master
Erika Stasiuleviciute as Master (flashback)
 Scott Daniel as Torch Coven Member
 Wendy Oates as Coveness
 Kevin Ragsdale as Wade
 Justin Paitsel as Coven Member
 Bobby Davis as Coven Member
 Russ Gladden as Coven Member

Release
It was released on February 4, 2022.

Reception

Metacritic, which uses a weighted average, assigned the film a score of 44 out of 100, based on 6 critics, indicating "mixed or average reviews".

Nadir Samara of Screen Rant give the film a mixed review and wrote: 

Richard Whittaker of The Austin Chronicle give the film a positive review and wrote: 

Peter Sobczynski of RogerEbert.com give the film a 1 and half star and wrote: 

Michael Pementel of Bloody Disgusting give the film a mixed to positive review and wrote:

References

External links
 
 
 The Long Night at Rotten Tomatoes

2022 films
Films set in Charleston, South Carolina
Films shot in South Carolina
American horror films
Films about cults
2022 horror films
2020s English-language films
Films directed by Rich Ragsdale
2020s American films